Auricular artery may refer to:

 Deep auricular artery
 Posterior auricular artery